Opogona aurisquamosa is a moth of the family Tineidae. It has been recorded from the Pacific, including Easter Island, the Marquesas, the Society Islands, Fiji, the Kermadec Islands and Hawaii. It may have been dispersed by the Polynesians as well as by Europeans.

Adults are bronzy yellowish with violet or purplish metallic reflections, particularly in the forewings. The wings are somewhat bent down at the tips.

The larvae are scavengers and have been reared from dead or decayed materials including Alectryon macrococcus, Bambusa, banana, Ricinus communis, Clermontia, decayed fruits, dry cow dung, palm fronds, Pipturus, rotten wood, Sicana odorifera, sugarcane and Thespesia populnea. The full-grown larva is 15–18 mm long and dull dirty white.

The pupa is 6-6.5 mm in length and light brown. The pupa is formed in a compact cocoon made in the place where the larva has fed. The cocoon is about 8 mm long and covered with frass and other debris.

References

External links

Opogona
Moths of New Zealand
Moths described in 1913